Oblivion (stylized as OBLiViON) is the fifth studio album by American musician T-Pain, released through Konvict Muzik, RCA Records and his own label Nappy Boy Entertainment on November 17, 2017. It is his second album released after the closure of Jive Records and his final album under Akon's Konvict Muzik label. Recording sessions for the album took place from 2014 to 2017.

Critical reception

HipHopDX said, "Fans of T-Pain will find that his fifth go-around is a quality cure for their six-year itch. One thing can be said for the rapper/singer: he never under-delivers — even if the expectation is for him to totally drop a masterpiece onto the world". Damien Morris of The Guardian expressed a negative response of the album saying that "the music is just tasteless and tired, the sound of a migraine struggling to maintain an erection".

Track listing
Credits adapted from Tidal and XXL.

Personnel
Credits adapted from Tidal and XXL.

Performers
 T-Pain – primary artist
 Chris Brown – featured artist 
 Tiffany Evans – featured artist 
 Mr. TalkBox – featured artist 
 Wale – featured artist 
 Blac Youngsta – featured artist 
 Ty Dolla Sign – featured artist 
 Ne-Yo – featured artist 
 Roberto Cacciapaglia – featured artist 

Technical
 T-Pain – recording engineer 
 Fabian Marasciullo – mixing engineer 
 McCoy Socalgargoyle – assistant mixing engineer 
 Colin Leonard – mastering engineer 
 Javier Valverde – engineering 

Production
 Dre Moon – production 
 TBHits – production 
 T-Pain – production 
 A1 – production 
 Allstar – production 
 X-plosive – production 
 Abaz – production 
 Mr. Franks – production 
 Major Seven – production 
 BZRK – production

Charts

References

2017 albums
T-Pain albums
RCA Records albums
Albums produced by T-Pain